"On Our Own" is a song by American singer Bobby Brown from the soundtrack of the 1989 Columbia motion picture Ghostbusters II. It was released as a single on June 22, 1989. It peaked at number one on the US Billboard Hot Black Singles chart for one week and at number two on the Billboard Hot 100 for three weeks. Outside the US, it reached number one in New Zealand for three weeks and became a top-five hit in Canada, Ireland, and the United Kingdom, while in Australia it went to number 22.

Music video
The video was filmed in May 1989 and released in June. The video features several guest appearances by celebrities including Jane Curtin, Malcolm Forbes, Iman, Victoria Jackson, Sally Kirkland, Rick Moranis, Joey and Marky Ramone of the Ramones, Christopher Reeve, Lori Singer, Doug E. Fresh, and Donald Trump. Additionally, there are scenes from Ghostbusters II, interspersed with New York City locations such as the Trump Tower, World Trade Center, and Plaza Hotel.

Personnel
 Bobby Brown: lead vocals, rap
 L.A. Reid: drums, percussion
 Babyface: keyboards, backing vocals
 Kayo: synthesized bass
 Donald Parks: Fairlight programming
 Daryl Simmons, Melvin Edmonds, Kevon Edmonds, Keith Mitchell: backing vocals

Charts

Weekly charts

Year-end charts

Certifications

In popular culture
The song appears in the next-gen versions of Grand Theft Auto V on Non-Stop Pop FM.

References

Bobby Brown songs
1989 songs
1989 singles
Number-one singles in New Zealand
Ghostbusters music
Songs written for films
Songs written by Daryl Simmons
Songs written by L.A. Reid
Songs written by Babyface (musician)
Song recordings produced by Babyface (musician)
MCA Records singles
Music videos directed by Alek Keshishian